Richard Ronald Eakin (born August 6, 1938) was the eighth chancellor of East Carolina University.  He was born in New Castle, Pennsylvania and earned his bachelor's degree in mathematics and physics, summa cum laude, from Geneva College. He earned his master's and doctorate degree in mathematics from Washington State University in 1962 and 1964. He started his career on the mathematics faculty at Bowling Green State University. He was named chancellor in 1987.

References

External links 
 Eakin biography

1938 births
Presidents of East Carolina University
Living people